Eshkali Seyyedi (also Romanized as Eshkālī Seyyedī; also known as Aḩshām-e Seyyed) is a village in Ahram Rural District, in the Central District of Tangestan County, Bushehr Province, Iran. At the 2006 census, its population was 59, in 12 families.

References 

Populated places in Tangestan County